John Graham "Mitch" Mitchell (9 July 194612 November 2008) was an English drummer and child actor, who was best known for his work in the Jimi Hendrix Experience for which he was inducted into the Rock and Roll Hall of Fame in 1992. He was inducted into the Modern Drummer Hall of Fame in 2009.

Biography

Early days
Mitchell was born in Ealing, Middlesex, to Phyliss C (née Preston) and Thomas J Mitchell  on 9 July 1946 (although several modern sources have incorrectly claimed that he was born in 1947). As a twelve year old, he had a leading role in the British film Bottoms Up (1960) with Jimmy Edwards. As a teenager he starred in a children's television programme, Jennings at School and also had a bit part in the 1963 film Live It Up! which starred Heinz Burt, David Hemmings and Steve Marriott.

Mitchell became a musician through working at Jim Marshall's drum shop on Saturdays while still at school. Among drummers, his chief influences were Elvin Jones and Tony Williams. One of his first bands was the Soul Messengers, formed at the Ealing Club with saxophonist Terry Marshall, son of Jim Marshall.

Early in his career, he gained considerable musical experience as a touring and session musician, working with Pete Nelson and the Travellers, Frankie Reid and the Casuals (1962), Johnny Harris and the Shades, the Pretty Things, Bill Knight & the Sceptres, the Riot Squad, and the Who as a session drummer while the band was in the process of replacing Doug Sandom with Keith Moon. In 1965, he also temporarily replaced Viv Prince as drummer in the Pretty Things.

Georgie Fame and the Blue Flames
From December 1965 until October 1966, Mitchell was the drummer of Georgie Fame and the Blue Flames, appearing on their 1966 album Sweet Things. In a 2015 interview, Fame recalled: "His main hero was jazz drummer Ronnie Stephenson and if you look at early film clips of Mitch, he had that Ronnie Stephenson look, the way he set his jaw. And he loved crashing around on the cymbals like Ronnie, but in my band I liked the arrangements pretty tight. When he started splashing around I'd say 'just play the hi-hat!'".

The Jimi Hendrix Experience
Mitchell auditioned for the Jimi Hendrix Experience on 6 October 1966 and was chosen over Aynsley Dunbar in a coin toss.  Mitchell's fast, driving, jazz-influenced playing meshed well with Hendrix's open-ended, revolutionary approach to the electric guitar. He played on the three best-selling Experience studio albums, Are You Experienced (1967), Axis: Bold As Love (1968), and Electric Ladyland (1968).

Mitchell remained with Hendrix after the Experience broke up when Noel Redding quit in June 1969. He performed with Hendrix's expanded lineup at Woodstock (August 1969).  Mitchell was replaced briefly with Buddy Miles  for the Band of Gypsys album (1970), but rejoined Hendrix (with Billy Cox on bass) for the April–September 1970 the Cry of Love Tour. He recorded most of the material for the posthumously-released Hendrix studio albums The Cry of Love (1971) (also listed as a co-producer), Rainbow Bridge (1971), and War Heroes (1972).

Drum sets
Mitchell debuted with the Hendrix Experience playing a Premier drum kit in England and Europe in 1967. When the Experience came to the US for the Monterey Pop Music Festival in June 1967 Mitchell was playing that same set. Later in the summer, Mitchell switched to a Ludwig drum set and stayed with Ludwig through the rest of the year, 1967, and continued with Ludwig in 1968 and 1969. In 1970, Mitchell switched to a double-bass Gretsch Drums set, his last year with the Hendrix Experience. With the exception of the 1969 Woodstock Music Festival, during which he played a Rodgers Powertone snare drum, during his time with the JHE, Mitch played a Ludwig Supraphonic 400, a 5- by 14-inch metal snare drum. Much later, and until his untimely passing, he played DW drums.

Other projects
In December 1968, Mitchell played with the Dirty Mac, an impromptu band assembled for The Rolling Stones Rock and Roll Circus. Others included John Lennon as vocalist and rhythm guitarist "Winston Leg-Thigh"; Yoko Ono providing improvised primal screams; Eric Clapton as guitarist, and Keith Richards as bassist. The group recorded a cover of "Yer Blues" as well as a jam called "Whole Lotta Yoko". While working with Hendrix from late 1969 until early 1970, Mitchell also collaborated with the Jack Bruce and Friends band fronted by ex-Cream bassist/vocalist Jack Bruce, with keyboardist Mike Mandel and jazz-fusion guitarist and future the Eleventh House frontman Larry Coryell.

Post-Hendrix
After Hendrix' death, Mitchell finished production work with engineer Eddie Kramer on incomplete Hendrix recordings, resulting in the releases The Cry of Love and Rainbow Bridge. In 1972, he teamed up with guitarists Mike Pinera and April Lawton to form Ramatam. They recorded the first of Ramatam's two albums and were an opening act for Emerson, Lake & Palmer at a number of concerts. Mitchell and Hendrix had been offered spots in the band Keith Emerson and Greg Lake were forming, but Carl Palmer got the drum position instead. Ramatam never achieved commercial success, and Mitchell left the act before their second album was released. He also performed in concerts with Terry Reid, Jack Bruce, and Jeff Beck as a substitute for drummer Cozy Powell. Mitchell drummed alongside John Halsey in the 1970s jam band Hinkley's Heroes, the only time he played alongside another drummer. In 1974, he auditioned for Paul McCartney's band Wings but lost the part to Geoff Britton in another coin toss.

For the rest of the 1970s through to the 1990s, Mitchell, semi-retired and living in Europe, continued to perform and occasionally record. In 1986, Mitchell teamed up with jazz musician Greg Parker and made a music video session of Led Zeppelin's "Black Dog". He did session work on Junior Brown's Long Walk Back album and participated in various Hendrix-related recordings, videos, and interviews. In 1999, Mitchell was part of the Gypsy Sun Experience, along with former Hendrix bassist Billy Cox and guitarist Gary Serkin. He also appeared on Bruce Cameron's album Midnight Daydream that included Billy Cox, Buddy Miles and Jack Bruce.

Death

He spent his final days celebrating Hendrix's music on the 2008 Experience Hendrix Tour. For nearly four weeks the tour travelled on an 18-city tour of the US, finishing in Portland, Oregon. The tour also featured Billy Cox, Buddy Guy, Jonny Lang, Robby Krieger, Kenny Wayne Shepherd, Eric Johnson, Cesar Rosas, David Hidalgo, Brad Whitford, Hubert Sumlin, Chris Layton, Eric Gales, and Mato Nanji. Five days after the tour ended, Mitchell died in his sleep on 12 November, in his room at the Benson Hotel in Portland of "natural causes". Mitchell had been in ill health for many years due to an immune system disorder and cancer. Mitchell had earlier bouts with extreme fatigue but had recovered from them after a few days' rest in 2007 and 2008. But by the end of the 2008 show, Mitchell was playing only two or three songs and always with a backup drummer alongside. At his last concert in Portland, Oregon, Mitchell looked so weak that his drum technician and tour manager asked him to sit out the entire show. The drum tech filled in for him on the drums on this, the last show of the tour, and the last show of his life. After that last show of the 2008 "Experience Hendrix" tour, Mitchell had asked the "Experience Hendrix" tour with which he was touring to allow him to rest up a few days due to exhaustion. From Seattle, he had planned to return to his home in England. The tour manager respected Mitchell's request but had outspoken reservations about its wisdom. The tour manager's concern was validated when Mitchell died in his sleep that same night.

Legacy
Queen drummer Roger Taylor has described Mitchell as his early role model. He said: "I still think listening to Mitch Mitchell, especially the early stuff with Hendrix, is just fantastic". Matt Sorum, drummer with the Cult, Guns N' Roses, and Velvet Revolver, has praised his "pure musicianship" and called him "one of the greatest drummers of all time".

In an interview with the Police drummer Stewart Copeland in the late 2000s, Copeland listed the Jimi Hendrix Experience debut album Are You Experienced as his favourite drum album of all time, and relates that as a child in school, he would walk around with drum beats in his head and wonder how Mitch Mitchell would carve out a rhythm were he to play that song.

In 2016, Mitchell was named the eighth-greatest drummer of all time by Rolling Stone magazine.

Discography
For a more complete listing of Mitchell's recordings with Hendrix, see Jimi Hendrix discography and Jimi Hendrix posthumous discography.

 1966: Georgie Fame — Sweet Things
 1967: Wishful Thinking — Count to Ten(Decca F12598, UK, DK)
 1967: The Jimi Hendrix Experience — Are You Experienced
 1967: The Jimi Hendrix Experience — Axis: Bold As Love
 1968: The Jimi Hendrix Experience — Electric Ladyland
 1969: Martha Veléz — Fiends and Angels
 1971: Jimi Hendrix — The Cry of Love
 1971: Jimi Hendrix — Rainbow Bridge
 1972: Jimi Hendrix — War Heroes
 1972: Ramatam — Ramatam
 1975: Mitch Mitchell - Squeeze My Little Finger / Put Your Faith in Me
 1980: Roger Chapman — Mail Order Magic
 1986: Greg Parker — Black Dog
 1996: David Torn — What Means Solid, Traveller?
 1998: Junior BrownLong Walk Back
 1999: Bruce CameronMidnight Daydream

References

Further reading
 Herman, Gary (December 1981/January 1982)."The Continuing Experience of Mitch Mitchell". Modern Drummer.
 Griffith, Mark (April 2009). "The Jimi Hendrix Experience's Mitch Mitchell". Modern Drummer.

External links
Remembered at NPR
www.MitchDrummer.com website that covers Mitch's life and music

1946 births
2008 deaths
English male television actors
English male child actors
English rock drummers
Death in Oregon
People from Ealing
The Jimi Hendrix Experience members
Gypsy Sun and Rainbows members
The Dirty Mac members
British rhythm and blues boom musicians
The Who
Screaming Lord Sutch and the Savages members